Teutonicus is Latin for Teutonic or Germanic.

It was often used as a surname in the Middle Ages:

 Walerland Teutonicus - 13th century Lord Warden of the Cinque Ports
 Notker Teutonicus (950–1022) - monk and author
 Franco Teutonicus or Franco of Cologne - 13th century music theorist
 Theodoricus Teutonicus de Vrîberg or Theodoric of Freiberg (ca. 1250–ca. 1310) - Dominican friar and physicist
 Julianus Teutonicus or Julian of Speyer - 13th century Franciscan friar, composer, poet and historian
 Johannes Teutonicus or John of Wildeshausen (ca. 1180–1252) - Master General of the Dominican order
 Johannes Teutonicus Zemeke (d. 1245) - glossator on the Decretum Gratiani

Other uses include:

 Furor Teutonicus ("Teutonic Fury"), Latin phrase referring to the proverbial ferocity of the Teutones
 Mos Teutonicus - an embalming method
 Ordo Teutonicus - "German Order", The Teutonic Knights